The 2009-10 CIS women's ice hockey season began in October 2009 and ended with the Alberta Pandas claiming the 2010 CIS National Championship.

Season outlook

Pre-season polls
1. McGill
2. Wilfrid Laurier
3. Manitoba
4. Moncton
5. Alberta
6. St. Francis Xavier (StFX)
7. Guelph
8. York
9. Toronto
10. Saskatchewan

Exhibition

NCAA Exhibition
Throughout the season, various NCAA schools played Canadian Interuniversity Sport hockey teams in exhibition games.

Regular season
February 16: The undefeated McGill Martlets were the No. 1 ranked team for the 38th consecutive week, dating back to Nov. 6, 2007.

Polls
As of February 16
1. McGill (18-0-0) / (1)
2. Wilfrid Laurier (26-0-1) / (2)
3. Alberta (21-1-0) / (3)
4. Moncton (18-2-1) / (4)
5. StFX (17-2-3) / (5)
6. Manitoba (18-4-0) / (6)
7. Queen's (19-5-3) / (7)
8. Saskatchewan (14-5-3) / (10)
9. York (17-9-1) / (9)
10. Montreal (12-5-1) / (8)

Standings

Atlantic University Sport

Canada West
In Canada West, an overtime loss is worth 1 point

The top four teams qualify for the playoffs

OUA

QSSF

2010 Olympics
The following active and former CIS players represented their respective countries in the women's ice hockey tournament at the 2010 Winter Olympics.

Stats leaders

Skaters

AUS conference leaders

Postseason

CIS Tournament
The Alberta Pandas defeated the McGill Martlets to claim the 2010 Canadian Interuniversity Championship. The Pandas ended the Martlets historic 86 game unbeaten streak against CIS opponents. Said streak dated back to December 30 of 2007. It was the Pandas who also beat the Martlets back on that date. Alberta had notched a 2–1 shootout victory. With the win, the Pandas also snapped the Martlets 20 game unbeaten streak in the postseason. This streak is also linked to the Alberta Pandas who claimed a 4–0 win in the 2007 CIS gold medal game. In the 2010 Championship Game, Melody Howard's unassisted goal at 6:09 in the first period held up as the game-winning goal. Forward Alana Cabana scored the second goal of the game.

Awards and honors
Liz Knox, Laurier, Brodrick Trophy (CIS Player of the Year)
Caitlin MacDonald, Manitoba, CIS Rookie of the Year
Kaitlyn McNutt, Dalhousie, CIS Marion Hillard Award (achievements as athlete, student and volunteer)
Christine Allen, Ottawa, QSSF Marion Hillard Award
Veronica Johnston, Western Mustangs, OUA Marion Hillard Award
Stacy Corfield, Manitoba Bisons, Hockey West Marion Hillard Award
Steve Kook, Saskatchewan, CIS Coach of the Year

CIS All-Star teams

First Team
Goaltender, Liz Knox, Laurier
Defence, Cathy Chartrand, McGill
Defence, Caitlin MacDonald, Manitoba
Forward, Ann-Sophie Bettez, McGill
Forward, Mariève Provost, Moncton
Forward, Breanne George, Saskatchewan

Second Team
Goaltender, Stacey Corfield, Manitoba
Defence, Kelsey Webster, York
Defence, Nicole Pratt, Alberta
Forward, Tarin Podloski, Alberta
Forward, Vanessa Davidson, McGill
Forward, Rebecca Conroy, Queen's

CIS All-Rookie team
Goaltender, Mel Dodd-Moher, Queen's
Defence, Caitlin MacDonald, Manitoba
Defence, Rayna Cruickshank, UBC
Forward, Kim Deschênes, Montreal
Forward, Candice Styles, Laurier
Forward, Abygail Laking, StFX

CIS Tournament awards
CIS Tournament championship player of the game: Jennifer Jubb, Alberta
CIS Tournament MVP: Stephanie Ramsay, Alberta
CIS Tournament All-Stars
 Goaltender: Dana Vinge, Alberta
Defense: Stephanie Ramsay, Alberta
Forward: Leah Copeland, Alberta

AUS All-Stars

First Team
G, Kathy Desjardins, Moncton Aigles Bleues
D, Suzanne Fenerty, St. Francis Xavier X-Women
D, Marilyn Hay, St. Francis Xavier X-Women
F, Mariève Provost, Moncton Aigles Bleues
F, Kori Cheverie, Saint Mary's Huskies
F, Jocelyn LeBlanc, Dalhousie Tigers

Second Team
F, Valérie Boisclair, Moncton
F,  Jessica Shanahan, StFX
F, Carolyn Campbell, StFX
D, Laura Shearer, Dalhousie
D, Lucrece Nussbaum, St. Thomas
G, Meghan Corley-Byrne, Mount Allison

All-Rookie Team
F, Fielding Montgomery, Dalhousie
F, Abygail Laking, StFX
F, Amy Kelbaugh, St. Thomas
D, Rebecca Mosher, Saint Mary's
D, Jenna Downey, StFX
G, Kristin Wolfe, St. Thomas

Hockey West All-Stars

First Team
F: Breanne George, Saskatchewan
F: Tarin Podloski, Alberta
F: Leah Copeland, Alberta
D: Caitlin MacDonald, Manitoba
D: Nicole Pratt, Alberta
G: Stacey Corfield, Manitoba

References

External links
 The official site of CIS Women's Hockey Championship
  2010 CIS women's ice hockey Championship

See also 
Canadian Interuniversity Sport women's ice hockey championship
2011–12 Canadian Interuniversity Sport women's ice hockey season
2006–07 Canadian Interuniversity Sport women's ice hockey season

 
U Sports women's ice hockey seasons
Inter